Ronald Palomino (born 20 December 1998 in Cali) is a Colombian professional squash player. As of June 2021, he was ranked number 202 in the world.

References

1998 births
Living people
Colombian male squash players
Sportspeople from Cali
Competitors at the 2022 World Games
21st-century Colombian people
Competitors at the 2018 South American Games
Competitors at the 2022 South American Games
South American Games medalists in squash
South American Games gold medalists for Colombia
South American Games silver medalists for Colombia
South American Games bronze medalists for Colombia